This is a list of defunct airlines of Indonesia including the Dutch East Indies and Netherlands New Guinea.

See also
 List of airlines of Indonesia
 List of airports in Indonesia

References

Indonesia
Airlines
Airlines, defunct